The Roman Catholic Diocese of Oslo is an exempt diocese located in the city of Oslo in Norway.

Parishes 
The territory is divided into 25 parishes, located in the following sites: Oslo (3), Moss, Askim, Fredrikstad, Halden, Lillestrøm, Hamar, Kongsvinger, Lillehammer,  Jessheim, Hønefoss, Stabekk, Drammen, Fagernes, Tønsberg, Larvik, Sandefjord, Porsgrunn, Arendal, Kristiansand, Stavanger, Haugesund and Bergen.

History
By 1070, the see was established as the Diocese of Oslo, and the bishop was seated at St. Hallvard's Cathedral. In 1537 - in the course of the Lutheran Reformation in Denmark-Norway and Holstein - Christian III of Denmark suppressed the Catholic episcopates at the Norwegian sees. Thereafter Lutheranism prevailed in Scandinavia.

In 1582 the stray Catholics in Norway and elsewhere in Northern Europe were placed under the jurisdiction of a papal nuncio in Cologne. The Congregation de propaganda fide, on its establishment in 1622, took charge of the vast missionary field, which - at its third session - it divided among the nuncio of Brussels (for the Catholics in Denmark and Norway), the nuncio at Cologne (much of Northern Germany) and the nuncio to Poland (Finland, Mecklenburg, and Sweden).

In 1688 Norway became part of the Apostolic Vicariate of the Nordic Missions. The Paderborn bishops functioned as administrators of the apostolic vicariate. In 1834 the Catholic missions in Norway became part of the Apostolic Vicariate of Sweden, seated in the Swedish capital Stockholm. Whereas Norway north of the polar circle became the Apostolic Prefecture of the North Pole in 1855, the rest of Norway stayed with the Swedish vicariate. When a new Catholic missionary jurisdiction was established, it was not at any of the ancient episcopal sees but a mission “sui iuris” on 7 August 1868, created out of parts of North Pole prefecture and the Norwegian part of the Swedish vicariate. On 17 August 1869 the mission became the apostolic prefecture of Norway. On 11 March 1892 the Apostolic Prefecture of Norway was promoted to Apostolic Vicariate of Norway, with an altered name as the Apostolic Vicariate of Norway and Spitsbergen between 1 June 1913 and 15 December 1925.

On 10 April 1931 the apostolic vicariate was divided into the Apostolic Vicariate of Oslo (extant 1931–1953; comprising southern Norway), a Catholic jurisdiction for central Norway (called Missionary District of Central Norway, 1931–1935; Apostolic Prefecture of Central Norway, 1935–1953; Apostolic Vicariate of Central Norway, 1953–1979; Prelature of Trondheim since), and a jurisdiction for Norway north of the polar circle (called Missionary District of Northern Norway, 1931–1944; Apostolic Prefecture of Northern Norway, 1944–1955; Apostolic Vicariate of Northern Norway, 1955–1979; Prelature of Tromsø since). On 29 June 1953 the Apostolic Vicariate of Oslo became a separate Roman Catholic diocese, when the same status was given in Sweden to the Stockholm diocese.

On 26 February 2015, Norwegian authorities levelled charges of fraud against the Roman Catholic Diocese of Oslo and Bishop Bernt Ivar Eidsvig. In connection with the case, Norwegian police raided the offices of the diocese.

Leadership
Unusually for a Scandinavian diocese, a majority of Oslo's bishops have actually been of the local ethnicity (in this case, Norwegian).
 Bishops of Oslo (Roman rite)
 Bishop Bernt Ivar Eidsvig, C.R.S.A.(July 29, 2005 – present)
 Bishop Gerhard Schwenzer, SS.CC. (November 26, 1983 – July 29, 2005)
 Bishop John Willem Gran, O.C.S.O. (November 25, 1964 – November 2, 1983)
 Bishop Jacques Mangers, S.M. (June 29, 1953 – November 25, 1964)
 Vicars Apostolic of Oslo (Roman Rite) 
 Bishop Jacques Mangers, S.M. (July 12, 1932 – June 29, 1953)
 Vicars Apostolic of Norway (Roman Rite) 
 Bishop Olaf Offerdahl (March 13, 1930 – October 7, 1930)
 Fr. Olaf Offerdahl (later Bishop) (Apostolic Administrator October 11, 1928 – March 13, 1930)
 Bishop Johannes Olav Smit (December 15, 1925 – October 11, 1928)
 Vicars Apostolic of Norway and Spitsbergen (Roman Rite) 
 Bishop Johannes Olav Smit (April 11, 1922 – December 25, 1925)
 Bishop Johannes Olav Fallize (later Archbishop) (June 1, 1913 – June 21, 1922)
 Vicars Apostolic of Norway (Roman Rite) 
 Bishop Johannes Olav Fallize (later Archbishop) (March 11, 1892 – June 1, 1913)
 Prefects Apostolic of Norway (Roman Rite) 
 Fr. Johannes Olav Fallize (later Archbishop) (February 6, 1887 – March 11, 1892)

See also 

 List of Catholic dioceses in Norway
 List of Roman Catholic parishes in Norway
 List of Roman Catholic dioceses in Europe (Incl. Episcopal Conference of Scandinavia)
 St. Olav's Cathedral in Oslo
 St. Hallvard's Church and Monastery
 St. Ansgar's Church, Kristiansand
 Saint Paul Catholic Church, Bergen
 Roman Catholic Church in Norway
 Roman Catholic Territorial Prelature of Trondheim
 Roman Catholic Territorial Prelature of Tromsø
 St Svithun's Church, Stavanger
 Vår Frue Church (Porsgrunn)

Notes

References
 GCatholic.org
 Catholic Hierarchy
 Diocese website (Norwegian)

Roman Catholic dioceses in Norway
Roman Catholic dioceses in Nordic Europe
Catholic Church in Norway
Religion in Oslo
Organisations based in Oslo
1868 establishments in Norway